Yuriy Stetsko (born 4 August 1981) is a Ukrainian freestyle skier. He competed in the men's aerials event at the 1998 Winter Olympics.

References

External links
 

1981 births
Living people
Ukrainian male freestyle skiers
Olympic freestyle skiers of Ukraine
Freestyle skiers at the 1998 Winter Olympics
Sportspeople from Rivne